Castle of Terror is an interactive fiction game with graphics released for the Commodore 64 and ZX Spectrum by Melbourne House in 1984.

Gameplay
The player is given a quest by an old man at the local tavern to rescue his daughter from the clutches of the local Count (a vampire), who resides in the nearby castle. Throughout the game, the player gathers items, which can then be manipulated to solve various puzzles. The text based interface, coupled with a visual display of the player's location, is similar in style to the Commodore 64 version of The Hobbit.

Reception
The game received notoriety amongst gamers as being impossible to fully complete, namely due to there being no known way to kill the count or achieve a full score of 290 out of 290. Grahame Willis, author of the game, has since revealed that it is not possible to kill the count and that messages suggesting so were placed in the game intentionally to frustrate players.

At the time of its release, it received mixed reviews. Your Commodore praised the game, describing its graphics as "very good" and its playability as "user friendly". Your Computer criticized the game, marking it as "fuzzy" to play. It got a 67% rating from Zzap!64.

References

External links
 
 
 Castle of Terror at the Internet Archive

1984 video games
Commodore 64 games
Adventure games
ZX Spectrum games
Video games developed in Australia
1980s horror video games
Video games about vampires